Marc Oechler (born 11 February 1968) is a German former professional footballer who played as an attacking midfielder. He was, as of October 2012, a board member at 1. FC Nürnberg.

Oechler played for Kavala F.C. in the 1999–2000 Alpha Ethniki season.

References

External links
 Marc Oechler at glubberer.de 

1968 births
Living people
Footballers from Nuremberg
German footballers
Association football midfielders
Bundesliga players
2. Bundesliga players
Super League Greece players
1. FC Nürnberg players
Kavala F.C. players
German expatriate footballers
German expatriate sportspeople in Greece
Expatriate footballers in Greece